Alaska gold rush may refer to:

 Fairbanks Gold Rush

 Nome Gold Rush

 Klondike Gold Rush (although this was actually in Yukon, Canada)